Gustavo Guillén Ruiz (born September 24, 1991) is a Mexican footballer who plays as a midfielder for Atlético San Luis Premier.

Career
Guillen made his senior team debut at the age of 17 on September 17, 2011, versus Mérida in a 1–0 win. He scored his first goal with Irapuato's senior team on August 17, 2012, versus Necaxa in a 6–4 loss.

Club statistics

External links
 

1993 births
Living people
Mexican footballers
Association football midfielders
Irapuato F.C. footballers
Lobos BUAP footballers
Leones Negros UdeG footballers
Tlaxcala F.C. players
Pioneros de Cancún footballers
Sporting Canamy footballers
Ascenso MX players
Liga Premier de México players
Tercera División de México players
Footballers from Mexico City